Lavaur is a commune in the Tarn department in southern France.

History
Lavaur was taken in 1211 by Simon de Montfort during the wars of the Albigenses, a monument marking the site where Dame Giraude de Laurac (Lady of Lavaur) was killed, being thrown down a well and stoned to death. The town was also taken several times during the religious wars of the 16th century.

Geography
Lavaur stands on the left bank of the Agout, which is here crossed by a railway-bridge and a fine stone bridge of the 1770s. It lies 36 km southwest of Albi and 32 km east of Toulouse.

Demographics

Sights

From 1317 till the French Revolution Lavaur was the seat of a bishopric; Lavaur Cathedral, dedicated to Saint Alan, was built for this purpose, dating from the 13th, 14th and 15th centuries, with an octagonal bell-tower. A second, smaller square tower contains a jaquemart (a statue which strikes the hours with a hammer) of the 16th century. In the bishops garden is the statue of Emmanuel, comte de Las Cases, one of the companions of Napoleon at Saint Helena.

Economy
The town carries on distilling and flour-milling and the manufacture of brushes, plaster and wooden shoes.

Notable residents
Pierre Fabre, founder of Laboratoires Pierre Fabre
Étienne de Voisins-Lavernière (1813–1898), French deputy and then senator for Tarn

Miscellaneous
There is a subprefecture and a tribunal of first instance (a lower Court of Justice).

See also
Communes of the Tarn department

References

Communes of Tarn (department)
Languedoc